Bouthéldja is a district in El Taref Province, Algeria. It was named after its capital, Bouthéldja.

Municipalities
The district is further divided into 3 municipalities:
Bouteldja
Lac Des Oiseaux
Chefia

Districts of El Taref Province